{{Automatic taxobox
| image = Tutufa bufo 2010 G1.jpg
| image_caption = Two views of a shell of Tutufa bufo
| image2 = Tutufa_bubo_01.JPG
| image2_caption = Five views of a shell of Tutufa bubo
| taxon = Tutufa
| authority =  Jousseaume, 1881
| synonyms_ref = 
| synonyms =
 Bursa (Lampas) Schumacher, 1817 
 Bursa (Tutufa) Jousseaume, 1881
 Lampas Schumacher, 1817  (invalid: junior homonym of Lampas Montfort, 1808 [Foraminifera]; Tutufella is a replacement name)
 Tutufa (Tutufa) Jousseaume, 1881 · alternate representation
 Tutufa (Tutufella) Beu, 1981 · alternate representation
 Tutufella Beu, 1981 (Replacement name for Lampas Montfort, 1808 [Foraminifera]; Tutufella is a replacement name)
| display_parents = 3
}}Tutufa''' is a genus of sea snails, marine gastropod mollusks in the family Bursidae, the frog shells.

Species
Species within the genus Tutufa include:
 Tutufa bardeyi (Jousseaume, 1881)
 Tutufa boholica Beu, 1987
 Tutufa bubo (Linnaeus, 1758)
 Tutufa bufo (Röding, 1798)
 Tutufa nigrita Mühlhäusser & Blöcher, 1979
 Tutufa oyamai (Habe, 1973)
 Tutufa rubeta (Linnaeus, 1758)
 Tutufa tenuigranosa (E.A. Smith, 1914)
Synonyms
 Tutufa robusta T. Cossignani, 2009: synonym of Tutufa bufo'' (Röding, 1798)

References

External links
 Jousseaume, F. (1881). Description de nouvelles coquilles. Bulletin de la Société zoologique de France. 6: 172-188
  Schumacher, C. F. (1817). Essai d'un nouveau système des habitations des vers testacés. Schultz, Copenghagen. iv + 288 pp., 22 pls

Bursidae
Gastropod genera
Taxa named by Félix Pierre Jousseaume